Klecknersville is an unincorporated community in Moore Township in Northampton County, Pennsylvania. It is part of the Lehigh Valley metropolitan area, which had a population of 861,899 and was the 68th most populous metropolitan area in the U.S. as of the 2020 census.

Klecknersville is located along Pennsylvania Route 946, northwest of the intersection with Pennsylvania Route 987.

References

Unincorporated communities in Northampton County, Pennsylvania
Unincorporated communities in Pennsylvania